Frederick Lowe Soper  (December 13, 1893 – February 9, 1977) was an American epidemiologist.

Born in Hutchinson, Kansas, his first two degrees were received from the University of Kansas, an AB in 1914 and his Masters of Science in 1916. He received a doctorate from the Johns Hopkins School of Public Health. Soper spent the better part of his career working for the Rockefeller Foundation.  Fred Soper's best-known project was known as the Global Malaria Eradication Program.

Fred Soper was featured by journalist Malcolm Gladwell in a July 2, 2001 New Yorker article titled "The Mosquito Killer."

He died in Wichita, Kansas at the age of 83.

Bibliography
 Ventures in world health: the memoirs of Fred Lowe Soper. Washington, Pan American Health Organization, Pan American Sanitary Bureau, Regional Office of the World Health Organization, 1977
 J. Austin Kerr (ed.): Building the health bridge: selections from the work of Fred L. Soper. Bloomington, Indiana University Press, 1970
 Fred. L. Soper, D. Bruce Wilson, Servulo Lima and Waldemar Sá Antunes: The organization of permanent nationwide anti-Aedes Aegypti measures in Brazil. New York, The Rockefeller Foundation, 1943
 Fred L. Soper and D. Bruce Wilson: Anopheles gambiae in Brazil : 1930 to 1940. New York, Rockefeller Foundation, 1943

External links
 The Mosquito Killer
 Fred Lowe Soper Papers (1919-1975) - National Library of Medicine finding aid
 The Fred L. Soper Papers - Profiles in Science, National Library of Medicine

Malariologists
American epidemiologists
1893 births
1977 deaths
People from Hutchinson, Kansas
Léon Bernard Foundation Prize laureates